Peter Bauer (born October 29, 1957) is an author and computer graphics professional. He served as the Help Desk Director for KelbyOne (formerly the National Association of Photoshop Professionals)from 1999 to 2020. He is the author of "Photoshop for Dummies," as well as a number of other books on Adobe Photoshop, Adobe Illustrator, digital photography, and computer graphics. He also contributes to a number of graphics-related magazines and Internet sites.  He received the Photoshop Pioneer award in September 2005 and was inducted into the Photoshop Hall of Fame in September 2010.

Bauer is a member of the Professional Photographers of America and his photography has won numerous awards, both nationally and internationally. He taught Photoshop in the University of Notre Dame's Department of Art, Art History and Design.

Bauer is a native of Detroit, Michigan and a graduate of the University of Detroit Jesuit High School and Excelsior University (Regents College of the University of the State of New York). He served 11 years (1986–1997) in the United States Army as a military intelligence interrogator, including combat duty during the Gulf War (1991). Subsequent to his military service, he authored the "Statement on Interrogation Practices" for members of the United States Senate and House Committees on the Armed Forces (July 2006), which was signed by over 20 former military interrogators.

Bauer met and married his wife, Mary Ellen O'Connell while serving with the U.S. Army in Garmisch-Partenkirchen, Germany in 1996. O'Connell holds an endowed chair at the University of Notre Dame Law School.

References

1957 births
American photographers
University of Detroit Jesuit High School and Academy alumni
Excelsior College alumni
Artists from Detroit
Living people